While Paris Sleeps is a 1932 American pre-Code drama film directed by Allan Dwan and starring Victor McLaglen, Helen Mack and Rita La Roy.

Plot 
Jacques Costaud, a French war veteran is sentenced to life in prison for killing a man but soon escapes from a penal colony in French Guiana. He then flees to Paris to find his daughter Manon, who believes him dead. Now he must try to keep her from being abducted into a life of prostitution and keeping his true identity a secret.

Cast 

 Victor McLaglen as Jacques Costaud
 Helen Mack as Manon Costaud
 William Bakewell as Paul Renoir
 Jack La Rue as Julot
 Rita La Roy as Fifi
 Maurice Black as Roca
 Dot Farley as the Concierge
 Lucille La Verne as Mme. Golden Bonnet
 Paul Porcasi as Kapas
 Edward Dillon as the Concierge's husband
 Arthur Stone as Mouche
 Martin J. Faust as Apache

References

External links 
 While Paris Sleeps (1932 film) at the Internet Movie Database
 While Paris Sleeps (1932 film) at Turner Classic Movies
 

1932 films
1932 drama films
American drama films
Fox Film films
Films directed by Allan Dwan
American black-and-white films
Films set in Paris
1930s English-language films
1930s American films